Crossroads is an unincorporated community located in Lea County, New Mexico, United States. Crossroads had its own post office until April 29, 1995; it still has its own ZIP code, 88114.

Notable person
Anna Crook, member of the New Mexico House of Representatives, was born in Crossroads

References

Unincorporated communities in Lea County, New Mexico
Unincorporated communities in New Mexico